"I Need An Angel" is a song written by R. Kelly, covered by Ruben Studdard

I Need An Angel	may also refer to:
I Need an Angel (album)
"I Need an Angel", song by Barbara Orbison 
"I Need an Angel", song by Blue Murder from Nothin' But Trouble 1993